League Collegiate Wear, Inc. is a college apparel company which sells university-licensed sportswear in the college bookstore market to over 3000 colleges and universities. In addition, it produces apparel for sales teams and sponsored events. It was founded in 1990 in Bridgeport, Pennsylvania.

External links
Official site

Companies based in Philadelphia
Clothing retailers of the United States
Sportswear brands
Clothing companies established in 1990
1990 establishments in Pennsylvania
American companies established in 1990